Jagadish Mohanty (17 February 1951 – 29 December 2013) was a renowned Odia writer, considered as a trendsetter in modern Odia fiction, has received the prestigious Sarala Award in 2003, Odisha Sahitya Akademi Award in 1990 for his novel Kanishka Kanishka, Dharitri Award in 1985, Jhankar Award, Prajatantra Award.
Born in Gorumahisani, an iron-ore mines in northern periphery in Mayurbhanj district of Odisha, he spent more than 30 years of his life working in the Mahanadi Coalfields Limited(MCL) in western periphery of Odisha. Though he kept himself away from the cultural capital of Odisha, but still his writings highlighted him in the mainstream of Odia literature and culture.

Indian feminist writer Sarojini Sahoo is his wife and  he has two children Anubhav and Sambedana. He died on 29 December 2013.

Novels

Kanishka Kanishka
Nija Nija Panipatha
Uttaradhikar
Durdina
Adrushya Sakala

Short stories

Ekaki Ashwarohi 
Dakshina Duari Ghara 
Irsha eka Rutu
Album 
Dipahara Dekhinathiba Lokatie 
Juddhakshtre Eka
Mephestophelese-ra Pruthibi
Nian  O Anyanya Galpa 
Suna Ilishi
Sundartam Pap 
Saturir Jagadish 
Bija Bruxsha Chhaya

Awards

He has been awarded with prestigious Sarala Award,  sponsored  by IMFA foundation in 2003 for his short story collection  Suna Ilishi,
Awarded with Odisha Sahitya Akademi Award in 1989 for his novel Kanishka Kanishka,
Awarded with Jhankar Award, Utkal Sahitya Samaj Katha Samman and Bhubaneswar Book fair Award  for his contribution to Odia fiction.
Besides this he has been felicated and awarded by Mahanadi Coalfields Limited (a subsidiary of Coal India), M/S J.K.Paper Mills Ltd, Jay Kay Pur, the Daily news paper Dharirti and other various institutions of Odisha.

Editing
He was the editor of a  Literary journal "The Sambartaka" from 1980 –82 .the journal has a great  significant value in the history of fiction writing in Odia literature.
Documentary
Delhi Doordarshan, a National  Channel of India  has telecast  a  documentary film on  both Jagadish and Sarojini, the couple writer of India under the title of Literary post card. Dr. Satti Khanna, of Duke University, Durham directed the documentary.

Translations

His stories have been translated in English, Hindi, Bengali, Malayalam and Telugu. His translated stories have been anthologized in different short story collections of HarperCollins, National Book Trust, Sahitya Academy, and Gyanapitha.

He himself also translated different Odia prose and poetry into Hindi and has been published in different Hindi literary magazines. He also occasionally writes in Hindi and his first Hindi story was published in Dharmayuga in 1979. Since then he occasionally writes in different Hindi magazines like  Samakaleen Bharatiya Sahitya, Dharmayuga, Sarika, Sakshatkar.

See also
 List of Indian writers

References

1951 births
2013 deaths
People from Mayurbhanj district
Odia-language writers
Writers from Odisha
Novelists from Odisha
Odia novelists
Odia short story writers
Indian male novelists
Indian male short story writers
Recipients of the Odisha Sahitya Akademi Award
20th-century Indian novelists
20th-century Indian short story writers
20th-century Indian male writers